OneTrust is a privacy and security software provider. The company is based in Atlanta, Georgia and was created in response to the increase in internet privacy regulation and laws. As of March 2022, OneTrust had more than 12,000 customers, and had a valuation of $5.3 billion.

History

OneTrust was founded in 2016 by Kabir Barday. Barday created OneTrust  in response to business needs to comply with the European Union’s General Data Protection Regulation, a law requiring websites to ask users if they agree to have their data tracked. The company’s software provided data mapping and self-assessment tools intended to show businesses how they comply with international and domestic privacy laws. OneTrust’s initial services also included risk evaluation, consent management, breach response and cookie compliance. After California passed the California Consumer Privacy Act in 2018, demand for privacy and security software increased, leading OneTrust to expand to offer toll-free numbers to manage consumer requests for personal data. OneTrust’s software also deploys pop-up website banners or menus asking consumers if they agreed to have their data tracked.

In March 2019, OneTrust acquired London-based privacy and security regulatory research platform DataGuidance. OneTrust acquired data discovery and classification software company Integris Software in 2020. Artificial intelligence data-redaction company Docuvision was acquired by OneTrust in 2021, as well as security certification company Tugboat Logic, “whistleblowing” software company Convercent, and Planetly, which helps companies manage and track carbon emissions.

In May 2022, the company released an automated “trust intelligence” platform designed to ensure data security, and help companies manage and understand governance, risk management, and compliance, privacy, ethics, and environmental, social, and corporate governance programs. The company reduced its workforce by 25% in June 2022, laying off 950 employees worldwide in response to the downturn in the capital markets.

As of March 2022, OneTrust had more than 12,000 customers, and had a valuation of $5.3 billion.

Products

OneTrust specializes in business to business security, data governance, internet and privacy compliance software. As of April 2021, the company held 140 patents.

References 

Companies based in Atlanta
Software companies of the United States
Privately held companies based in Georgia (U.S. state)